Cottonwood Township may refer to:

 Cottonwood Township, Cumberland County, Illinois
 Cottonwood Township, Chase County, Kansas
 Cottonwood Township, Brown County, Minnesota
 Cottonwood Township, Adams County, Nebraska
 Cottonwood Township, Nance County, Nebraska
 Cottonwood Township, Phelps County, Nebraska
 Cottonwood Township, Mountrail County, North Dakota, in Mountrail County, North Dakota

Township name disambiguation pages